The 1997 FIVB Volleyball Boys' U19 World Championship was held in Azadi Sport Complex, Tehran, Iran from 14 to 22 August 1997.

Venues
Azadi Volleyball Hall (Tehran)
Azadi Indoor Stadium (Tehran)

Preliminary round

Pool A

|}

|}

Pool B

|}

|}

Pool C

|}

|}

Pool D

|}

|}

Play-off

Seeding group

|}

Elimination group

|}

Final round

Championship

|}

|}

|}

Classification 5th–8th

|}

|}

Final standing

Awards
MVP:  Daniele Desiderio
Best Spiker:  Daniele Desiderio
Best Blocker:  Paolo Cozzi
Best Server:  Michal Rak
Best Digger:  José Manuel Genao
Best Setter:  William Arjona

References

External links
 www.fivb.org

FIVB Volleyball Boys' U19 World Championship
World Youth Championship
V
V